Jean Abel Gruvel (14 February 1870 in Le Fleix – 18 August 1941 in Dinard) was a French marine biologist known for his research of cirripedes.

Biography 
In 1894 he obtained his doctorate in sciences, and later taught classes in zoology for three years at the faculty of sciences at Bordeaux. In 1902 he founded the Société d'études et de vulgarisation de la zoologie agricole in Bordeaux. Later on, he was a professor at the Muséum national d'histoire naturelle in Paris, and was chair of the commission for the regulation of whaling for French West Africa and of the committee for the protection of colonial fauna and flora.

He was a member of the Conseil supérieur des colonies, of which, he served as vice-president of the department dealing with public works, merchant marine and fisheries, covering the western coast of Africa. Also, he was instrumental in the development of the Service océanographique des pêches de l'Indochine and in the establishment of research laboratories in Martinique, Guadeloupe, Réunion and New Caledonia. In 1933 he became head of the marine laboratory at the Museum, and in 1935, took on a similar role at the laboratory in Dinard (Aquarium et Musée de la Mer de Dinard).

Taxa 
He was the taxonomic authority of the crustacean subclass Thecostraca and of several families within this grouping; Tetraclitidae, Lithotryidae, Oxynaspididae, Anelasmatidae, Acrothoracica, Dendrogastridae, Lauridae, Petrarcidae and Synagogidae. The genera Gruvelia (family Chromodoridae) and Gruvelialepas (family Calanticidae) commemorate his name, as do taxa with the specific epithets of gruveli and gruvelianum.

Selected works 
 Contribution à l'étude des Cirrhipèdes, 1893 – Contribution to the study of cirripedes.
 Expéditions scientifiques du "Travailleur" et du "Talisman" : Cirrhipèdes, 1902 – Scientific expeditions of the "Travailleur" and the "Talisman": Cirripedes.
 Monographie des Cirrhipèdes ou Thécostracés, 1905 – Monograph on cirripedes or Thecostraca.
 Les pêcheries de la côte occidentale d'Afrique, 1906 – The fisheries on the west coast of Africa.
 A travers la Mauritanie Occidentale: de Saint-Louis à Port-Etienne (two volumes 1909, 1911; with René Chudeau) – A crossing of western Mauritania : Saint-Louis – Port-Etienne.
 Mission Gruvel sur la Côte occidentale d'Afrique (1909-1910), 1912 – The Gruvel mission to the west coast of Africa in 1909–10.
 L'industrie des pêches sur la Côte occidentale d'Afrique, 1913 – The fishing industry on the west coast of Africa.
 Cirrhipèdes provenant des campagnes scientifiques de S. A. S. le Prince de Monaco (1885-1913), 1920 – Cirripedes from the scientific campaigns of the  S. A. S. le Prince de Monaco (1885-1913).
 L'industrie des pêches sur la côte occidentale du Maroc, 1927 – The fishing industry on the west coast of Morocco.

References 

1870 births
1941 deaths
People from Dordogne
French marine biologists
French carcinologists
Academic staff of the University of Bordeaux
National Museum of Natural History (France) people